George Stewart (19 September 1901 – 26 August 1994) was an  Australian rules footballer who played with South Melbourne in the Victorian Football League (VFL).

Notes

External links 

1901 births
1994 deaths
Australian rules footballers from Victoria (Australia)
Sydney Swans players